The Catholic University School of Engineering is one of the twelve schools at The Catholic University of America, located in Washington, D.C. (USA), and one of 41 higher education catholic institutions that offer Engineering Programs in the United States. It was reported to be the biggest Catholic graduate school of engineering in the nation.

In 2020, it was ranked number 22 in the nation among colleges that offer a bachelor's degree in civil engineering based on median salary one year after graduating.

History 
The School of Engineering at Catholic University was formally established in 1930, but the first engineering program at the university was started back in 1896.

The school was soon renamed as the School of Engineering and Architecture, but retook the original name in 1992 when a new School of Architecture and Planning separated from the school.

Departments 
Biomedical Engineering
Civil and Environmental Engineering
Engineering Management
Electrical Engineering and Computer Sciences
Materials Science & Engineering
Mechanical Engineering

Undergraduate programs 
The school offers Bachelor's degrees in biomedical engineering, civil engineering, electrical engineering, mechanical engineering (all of them accredited by the Engineering Accreditation Commission -EAC- of the Accreditation Board for Engineering and Technology) and computer science.

Graduate programs 
Master of Science (M.S.) degrees are offered in biomedical engineering, civil and environmental engineering, engineering management, electrical engineering and computer science, materials science and engineering, and mechanical engineering, while Doctor of Philosophy (Ph.D.) degrees can be obtained in biomedical engineering, civil and environmental engineering, electrical engineering and computer science and mechanical engineering.

Foreign partnerships 
The school runs a dual-degree program with Marche Polytechnic University (Italy) that allows students in biomedical or environmental engineering to obtain two master’s degrees.

Alumni

Engineering Distinguished Alumni Award 
Melvin G. Williams, Jr., M.S.E. 1984. Former associate deputy secretary of energy.
Get Moy, B.C.E. 1974. Director of installations requirements and management for the U.S. Department of Defense.
Letitia A. Long, M.S.E. 1988. Former director of the National Geospatial-Intelligence Agency.

Alumni Wall of Fame 
The Catholic University School of Engineering honors alumni of the school at the Alumni Wall of Fame since 2008. Nominees are presented by the School of Engineering Executive Committee to the dean.

Michael D. Griffin, M.S.E.'74. Administrator of NASA from 2005 to 2009.
Paul G. Gaffney II, M.S.E.'70. President of Monmouth University and former president of the National Defense University.
Michael W. Michalak, M.S.E.'73. United States Ambassador to Vietnam.
James A. Wilding, B.C.E.'59. Former President/CEO of the Metropolitan Washington Airports Authority.
Charles H. Kaman, '40. Founder of Kaman Aircraft Company. 
Donald A. Lamontagne, B.S.E. 1969. Former commander of Air University.

References

External links 
Official website
Official school's history
Profile at Top Engineering Schools in U.S.A.

School of Engineering
Engineering universities and colleges in Washington, D.C.
Catholic engineering schools and colleges in the United States
Educational institutions established in 1930
1930 establishments in Washington, D.C.